The 1954–55 Czechoslovak Extraliga season was the 12th season of the Czechoslovak Extraliga, the top level of ice hockey in Czechoslovakia. 16 teams participated in the league, and Rudá Hvězda Brno won the championship.

Group A

Group B

Final round

1. Liga-Qualification

External links
History of Czechoslovak ice hockey

Czech
Czechoslovak Extraliga seasons
1954 in Czechoslovak sport
1955 in Czechoslovak sport